The Ministry of Civil Affairs is a ministry in the State Council of the People's Republic of China, responsible for social and administrative affairs. It was founded in May 1978, and the current Minister is Tang Dengjie. Its precedent was the Ministry of Internal Affairs.

History 
 November 1949, Ministry of Internal Affairs of Central People's Government established.
 September 1954, renamed Ministry of Internal Affairs of PR China.
 January 1969, the Ministry abolished.
 May 1978, Ministry of Civil Affairs of PR China founded.

List of Civil Ministers

See also 
 Administrative divisions of the People's Republic of China
 Urban planning in China
 Urban Planning Society of China
 Chinese Public Administration Society
 China Center of Adoption Affairs
 Ministries of the People's Republic of China

External links 
 

 
Civil Affairs
China
China
Ministries established in 1978
1978 establishments in China